Jalalabad Prison, also known as Jalalabad Central Jail, is a minimum security prison located in the downtown section of Jalalabad, Afghanistan. Mawolavi Bilal Shahin serves as the head of the prison. According to him, there are 1,100 inmates in the prison as of February 2023. The prison has the capacity to house up to 1,700 inmates that have been arrested and convicted within the jurisdiction of Nangarhar Province.

See also 
Jalalabad prison attack
List of prisons in Afghanistan

References

See also 

Prisons in Afghanistan